Gopeng is a town located in Mukim Teja, Kampar District, Perak, Malaysia.

History

Gopeng was the most important town in the Kinta Valley until 1890, when Ipoh became more prominent. Gopeng was intensively mined by both European and Chinese miners, the latter having significant Hakka representation under Chung Keng Kwee, the leader of the Hai San secret society during the Larut War. He was appointed as the Kapitan Cina after the Pangkor Treaty, and although his main homes were in Taiping and Penang, he maintained his foothold in Gopeng, securing contracts for street lighting there in 1892 as well as building quarters for civil servants thereafter. For the first few decades after British intervention, Gopeng was run by a tripartite; the Europeans, the Chinese led by the Eu family, and the Sumatrans by the Assistant Penghulu Imam Prang Ja Barumun. Gopeng is also one of the first places where large numbers of Orang Asli came into contact with outsiders in the 19th century.

Amenities
 Pejabat Pos Gopeng
 Balai Polis Gopeng
 Gopeng Fire and Rescue Station
 RTC Gopeng
 Padang Bandaran Gopeng

Commercial services
 Pasar Awam Gopeng
 Medan Purnama
 Hup Teck Soy Sauce Factory
 Gopeng Light Industrial Park

Transportation

Road network
Gopeng is located on the west side of the North-South Expressway stretch of Tapah-Simpang Pulai. The expressway cuts through the limestone hills and the Titiwangsa range, and Tapah-Gopeng stretch is one of the most scenic routes on the west coast of Peninsular Malaysia. On clear days, the Lata Kinjang waterfall could be seen on the right side of the highway for drivers heading up north to Gopeng.

Bus
 Stesen Bas Gopeng

Education

Primary schools

Vernacular schools
 SJK (C) Man Ming
 SJK (C) New Kopisan
 SJK (C) Lawan Kuda Baru

National schools
 SK Gopeng Taman Gopeng Baru (previous building now Pusat Giat Mara)
 SK Gopeng Jalan Ilmu (previous English School Gopeng)
 SK Sungai Itek
 SK Ulu Geruntum

Secondary schools
 SMK Idris Shah
 SMK Seri Teja
 Sekolah Berasrama Penuh Integrasi Gopeng

Tertiary institutions
 Perak Matriculation College
 Kolej Komuniti RTC Gopeng
 Akademi Kemahiran KEMAS Gopeng

Tourist Attraction
 Tempurung Cave
 Gopeng Heritage House
 Taman Herba Negeri Perak
 My Gopeng Resort
 Nomad Adventure Sdn Bhd

Notable personalities born in Gopeng
 Lat - Malaysian cartoonist, winner of the Fukuoka Asian Culture Prize in 2002
 Burhanuddin al-Helmy -  Malaysian politician, President of the Malaysian Islamic Party (PAS) from 1956 to his death in October 1969
 Chew Swee Kee - Singaporean politician, served as Minister of Education from 1955 to around 1959
 Rashid Maidin - senior leader of the Communist Party of Malaya (CPM).

References

Kampar District
Towns in Perak